Percival Eric Gratwick, VC (19 October 1902 – 26 October 1942) was an Australian recipient of the Victoria Cross, the highest award for gallantry in the face of the enemy that can be awarded to British and Commonwealth forces.

Early life
Gratwick was born in Katanning, Western Australia on 19 October 1902, the fifth son of the local postmaster. Leaving school at the age of 16, he took up various jobs which included a period as a messenger at Parliament House.  Later he worked as a blacksmith, a drover and a prospector.

Second World War
Upon the outbreak of the Second World War, Gratwick attempted to join the Second Australian Imperial Force (AIF). However, issues with his nose, which had been broken years earlier, led to the rejection of his application. In late 1940, after expensive medical treatment on his nose, he attempted to enlist again, this time successfully.

Following completion of his training in July 1941, Gratwick embarked for Libya, where he was assigned to the 2/48th Battalion (a South Australian unit) with the rank of private. The battalion was among the defenders of Tobruk but was transferred to Palestine in October 1941. By June 1942, the battalion was in Egypt.

On the night of 25/26 October 1942 during the Second Battle of El Alamein, Egypt, the platoon to which Gratwick belonged suffered considerable casualties attacking Trig 29, including the platoon commander and sergeant. Gratwick, realising the seriousness of the situation, charged a German machine-gun position by himself, and killed the crew with hand grenades. He also killed a mortar crew. Under heavy machine-gun fire Gratwick then charged a second post, using his rifle and bayonet. In inflicting further casualties he was killed by machine-gun fire, but his brave and determined action, for which he would be awarded a posthumous Victoria Cross, enabled his company to capture the final objective.

Gratwick is buried in El Alamein Commonwealth cemetery, and his Victoria Cross is displayed at the Army Museum of Western Australia in Fremantle, Western Australia. In Port Hedland, Western Australia, Gratwick Street, the Gratwick Aquatic Centre and the town theatre and community hall are all named in his honour.

References

1902 births
1942 deaths
Military personnel from Western Australia
Australian World War II recipients of the Victoria Cross
Australian Army personnel of World War II
People from Katanning, Western Australia
Australian military personnel killed in World War II
Australian Army soldiers